Naomi or Naomie may refer to:

People and biblical figures
 Naomi (given name), a female given name and a list of people with the name
 Naomi (biblical figure), Ruth's mother-in-law in the Old Testament Book of Ruth
 Naomi (Romanian singer) (born 1977), a.k.a. Naomy
 Naomi (wrestler) (born 1987), professional wrestler
 Terra Naomi, American indie folk singer-songwriter

Arts and entertainment

Fictional entities
 Naomi, a character in the 2009 American fantasy comedy movie 17 Again
 Naomi, a supporting character in the upcoming 2023 indie video game Goodbye Volcano High
 Naomi Bohannon, a character in the TV series Hell on Wheels
 Naomi, Florida, a fictional town in the Kate DiCamillo novel Because of Winn-Dixie
 Naomi Turner, a character in the American animated television series Elena of Avalor

Music
 Naomi Awards, a former British music award
 Naomi (album), by American band The Cave Singers
 "Naomi" (song), by Neutral Milk Hotel

Other uses in arts and entertainment
 Naomi (novel), a 1924 novel by Jun'ichirō Tanizaki
 Naomi (comics), a 2019 miniseries published by DC Comics under the Wonder Comics imprint
 Naomi (TV series), a 2022 series based on the comic book series of the same name
 "Naomi" (Skins), episode of British television drama Skins, 2009
 Sega NAOMI, an arcade hardware system

Places

United States
 Naomi, Georgia, an unincorporated community
 Naomi, Missouri, an unincorporated community
 Naomi, Ohio, an unincorporated community
 Naomi, Pennsylvania, an unincorporated community
 Naomi, South Dakota, an unincorporated community
 Naomi Peak, Utah
 Lake Naomi, Pocono Pines, Pennsylvania
 site of the Naomi Mine explosion, a 1907 mining disaster in Pennsylvania, United States

Other places
 Na'omi, an Israeli settlement

Other uses
 6139 Naomi, a main-belt asteroid
 Naomi Institute, a defunct school in Nebraska, United States

See also
 
 
 Noemi (disambiguation)
 Naiomi
 Nōami (1397–1471), Japanese painter, poet and art connoisseur